Manchuria is an exonym (derived from the endodemonym "Manchu") for a historical and geographic region in Northeast Asia encompassing the entirety of present-day Northeast China (Inner Manchuria) and parts of the Russian Far East (Outer Manchuria). Its meaning may vary depending on the context:
 Historical polities and geographical regions usually referred to as Manchuria:
 The Later Jin (1616–1636), the Manchu-led dynasty which renamed itself from "Jin" to "Qing", and the ethnicity from "Jurchen" to "Manchu" in 1636
 the subsequent duration of the Qing dynasty prior to its conquest of China proper (1644)
 the northeastern region of Qing dynasty China, the homeland of Manchus, known as  "Guandong" or "Guanwai" during the Qing dynasty
 The region of Northeast Asia that served as the historical homeland of the Jurchens and later their descendants the Manchus
Qing control of Dauria (the region north of the Amur River, but in its watershed) was contested in 1643 when Russians entered; the ensuing Sino-Russian border conflicts ended when Russia agreed to withdraw in the 1689 Treaty of Nerchinsk
controlled in whole by Qing dynasty China until the Amur Annexation of Outer Manchuria by Russia in 1858–1860
controlled as a whole by the Russian Empire after the Russian invasion of Manchuria in 1900 until the Russo-Japanese War and the Treaty of Portsmouth in 1905, which required Russian withdrawal.
controlled by Qing China again, and reorganised in 1907 under the Viceroy of the Three Northeast Provinces (東三省; the area had previously not been considered "provinces")
controlled by the Republic of China (1912–1949) after the 1911 revolution
controlled by the Fengtian clique lead by Zhang Zuolin from 1917 to 1928 (during the Warlord Era), until the military Northern Expedition and the Northeast Flag Replacement brought it under control the Republic of China again (specifically, the Nationalist government of the Second Republic of China, 1925–1948, then allied with the Chinese Communist Party)
controlled by Imperial Japan as the puppet state of Manchukuo, often translated as "Manchuria", (1932–1945). Formed after the Japanese invasion of Manchuria, it included all of Northeast China, the northern fringes of present-day Hebei Province, and the eastern part of Inner Mongolia.
briefly entirely controlled by the USSR after the Soviet invasion of Manchuria in 1945, but then divided with China
 Modern Northeast China (also known as "Inner Manchuria"), specifically the three provinces of Heilongjiang, Jilin, and Liaoning, but broadly also including the eastern Inner Mongolian prefectures of Hulunbuir, Hinggan, Tongliao, and Chifeng, and sometimes Xilin Gol
Areas of the modern Russian Federation also known as Outer Manchuria. The two areas involved are Priamurye between the Amur River and the Stanovoy Range to the north, and Primorye which runs down the coast from the Amur mouth to the Korean border, including the island of Sakhalin

First used in the 19th century by the Japanese, the term is deprecated among people of the People's Republic of China (PRC) due to its association with Japanese imperialism, the puppet state of Manchukuo of the Empire of Japan, and Manchurian nationalism. Official state documents use the term Northeast Region (东北; Dōngběi) to describe the region. Northeast China is predominantly occupied by Han Chinese due to internal Chinese migrations and Sinicization of the Manchus, especially during the Qing dynasty. It is considered the homeland of several minority groups besides the Manchus, including the Yemaek the Xianbei, the Shiwei, and the Khitans. The area is also home to many Mongols and Hui.

Manchuria is often referred to as the "Chinese rust belt", due to the shrinking cities that used to be the center of China's heavy industry and natural resource mining, which today face increasing economic decline.

Boundaries 

Manchuria is now most often associated with the three Chinese provinces of Heilongjiang, Jilin, and Liaoning. The former Japanese puppet state of Manchukuo further included the prefectures of Chengde (now in Hebei), and Hulunbuir, Hinggan, Tongliao, and Chifeng (now in Inner Mongolia). The region of the Qing dynasty referenced as Manchuria originally further included Primorskiy Kray, the Jewish Autonomous Oblast, the southern parts of Amur Oblast and Khabarovskiy Kray, and a corner of Zabaykalʼskiy Kray. These districts were acknowledged as Qing territory by the 1689 Treaty of Nerchinsk but ceded to the Russian Empire due to the Amur Annexation in the unequal 1858 Treaty of Aigun and 1860 Convention of Beijing. (The People's Republic of China indirectly questioned the legitimacy of these treaties in the 1960s but has more recently signed agreements such as the 2001 Sino-Russian Treaty of Friendship, which affirm the current status quo; a minor exchange nonetheless occurred in 2004 at the confluence of the Amur and Ussuri rivers.) Various senses of Greater Manchuria sometimes further include Sakhalin Island, which despite its lack of mention in treaties was shown as Qing territory on period Chinese, Japanese, Russian, and French maps of the area.

Etymology and names 

 "Manchuria"variations of which arrived in European languages through Dutchis a Latinate calque of the Japanese place name Manshū  "Region of the Manchus"), which dates from the 19th century. The name Manju was invented and given to the Jurchen people by Hong Taiji in 1635 as a new name for their ethnic group; however, the name "Manchuria" was never used by the Manchus or the Qing dynasty itself to refer to their homeland.

According to the Japanese scholar Junko Miyawaki-Okada, the Japanese geographer Takahashi Kageyasu was the first to use the term Manshū as a place name in 1809 in the Nippon Henkai Ryakuzu, and it was from that work that Westerners adopted the name. According to Mark C. Elliott, the term Manshū first appeared as a place name in Katsuragawa Hoshū's 1794 work Hokusa Bunryaku in two maps, "Ashia zenzu" and "Chikyū hankyū sōzu", which were also created by Katsuragawa. Manshū then began to appear as a place name in more maps created by Japanese like Kondi Jūzō, Takahashi Kageyasu, Baba Sadayoshi and Yamada Ren, and these maps were brought to Europe by the Dutch Philipp von Siebold. According to Nakami Tatsuo, Philip Franz von Siebold was the one who brought the usage of the term Manchuria to Europeans after borrowing it from the Japanese, who were the first to use it in a geographic manner in the 18th century.

According to Bill Sewell, it was Europeans who first started using the name Manchuria to refer to the location and it is "not a genuine geographic term". The historian Gavan McCormack agreed with Robert H. G. Lee's statement that "The term Manchuria or Man-chou is a modern creation used mainly by westerners and Japanese", with McCormack writing that the term Manchuria is imperialistic in nature and has no "precise meaning" since the Japanese deliberately promoted the use of "Manchuria" as a geographic name to promote its separation from China at the time they were setting up their puppet state of Manchukuo.

The Japanese had their own motive for deliberately spreading the usage of the term Manchuria. The historian Norman Smith wrote that "The term 'Manchuria' is controversial". Professor Mariko Asano Tamanoi said that she "should use the term in quotation marks" when referring to Manchuria.

In 18th-century Europe, the region later known as "Manchuria", was most commonly referred to as "[Chinese] Tartary". However, the term Manchuria (Mantchourie, in French) started appearing by the end of the century; French missionaries used it as early as 1800. The French-based geographers Conrad Malte-Brun and Edme Mentelle promoted the use of the term Manchuria (Mantchourie, in French), along with "Mongolia", "Kalmykia", etc., as more precise terms than Tartary, in their world geography work published in 1804.

In present-day Chinese, an inhabitant of the Northeast is a "Northeasterner". "The Northeast" is a term that expresses the entire region, encompassing its history and various cultures. It's usually restricted to the "Three East Provinces" or "Three Northeast Provinces", excluding northeastern Inner Mongolia. In China, the term Manchuria is rarely used today, and the term is often negatively associated with the Japanese imperial legacy and the puppet state of Manchukuo.

Manchuria has been referred to as Guandong, which literally means "east of the pass", and similarly Guanwai, a reference to Shanhai Pass in Qinhuangdao in today's Hebei, at the eastern end of the Great Wall of China. This usage is seen in the expression Chuǎng Guāndōng (literally "Rushing into Guandong") referring to the mass migration of Han Chinese to Manchuria in the 19th and 20th centuries. The name Guandong later came to be used more narrowly for the area of the Kwantung Leased Territory on the Liaodong Peninsula. It is not to be confused with the southern province of Guangdong.

During the Qing dynasty, the region was known as the "three eastern provinces" (Manchu, Dergi Ilan Golo) since 1683 when Jilin and Heilongjiang were separated even though it was not until 1907 that they were turned into actual provinces. The administrators of the three areas were the General of Heilongjiang (Sahaliyan Ula i Jiyanggiyūn), General of Jilin (Girin i Jiyanggiyūn), and General of Shengjing (Mukden i Jiyanggiyūn). The area of Manchuria was then converted into three provinces by the late Qing government in 1907. Since then, the phrase "Three Northeast Provinces" was officially used by the Qing government in China to refer to this region, and the post of Viceroy of the Three Northeast Provinces (dergi ilan goloi uheri kadalara amban) was established to take charge of these provinces. After the 1911 revolution, which resulted in the collapse of the Manchu-established Qing dynasty, the name of the region where the Manchus originated was known as "the Northeast" in official documents in the newly founded Republic of China, in addition to the "Three Northeast Provinces".

During the Ming dynasty the area where the Jurchens lived was referred to as Nurgan. Nurgan was the area of modern Jilin in Manchuria.

Geography and climate 

Manchuria consists mainly of the northern side of the funnel-shaped North China Craton, a large area of tilled and overlaid Precambrian rocks spanning . The North China Craton was an independent continent before the Triassic period and is known to have been the northernmost piece of land in the world during the Carboniferous. The Khingan Mountains in the west are a Jurassic mountain range formed by the collision of the North China Craton with the Siberian Craton, which marked the final stage of the formation of the supercontinent Pangaea.

No part of Manchuria was glaciated during the Quaternary, but the surface geology of most of the lower-lying and more fertile parts of Manchuria consists of very deep layers of loess, which have been formed by the wind-borne movement of dust and till particles formed in glaciated parts of the Himalayas, Kunlun Shan and Tien Shan, as well as the Gobi and Taklamakan Deserts. Soils are mostly fertile mollisols and fluvents except in the more mountainous parts where they have poorly developed orthents, as well as in the extreme north where permafrost occurs and orthels dominate.

The climate of Manchuria has extreme seasonal contrasts, ranging from humid, almost tropical heat in summer to windy, dry, Arctic cold in winter. This pattern occurs because the position of Manchuria on the boundary between the great Eurasian continental landmass and the huge Pacific Ocean causes complete monsoonal wind reversal.

However, because the winds from Siberia are exceedingly dry, snow falls only on a few days every winter, and it is never heavy. This explains why corresponding latitudes of North America were fully glaciated during glacial periods of the Quaternary while Manchuria, though even colder, always remained too dry to form glaciers – a state of affairs enhanced by stronger westerly winds from the surface of the ice sheet in Europe.

History

Early history 

Manchuria was the homeland of several ethnic groups, including Manchu, Mongols, Koreans, Nanai, Nivkhs, Ulchs, Hui and possibly Turkic peoples and ethnic Han Chinese in southern Manchuria. Various ethnic groups and their respective kingdoms, including the Sushen, Donghu, Xianbei, Wuhuan, Mohe, Khitan and Jurchens, have risen to power in Manchuria. Various Koreanic kingdoms such as Gojoseon (before 108 BCE), Buyeo (2nd century BCE to 494 CE) and Goguryeo (37 BCE to 688 CE) also became established in large parts of this area. The Han dynasty (202 BCE to 9 CE and 25 to 220 CE), the Cao Wei dynasty (220–266), the Western Jin dynasty (266–316), the Tang dynasty (618–690 and 705–907) and some other minor kingdoms of China established control in parts of Manchuria and in some cases tributary relations with peoples in the area. Parts of northwestern Manchuria came under the control of the First Turkic Khaganate of 552–603 and of the Eastern Turkic Khaganate of 581–630. Early Manchuria had a mixed economy of hunting, fishing, livestock, and agriculture.

With the Song dynasty (960-1269) to the south, the Khitan people of Inner Mongolia created the Liao dynasty (916-1125) and conquered Outer Mongolia and Manchuria, going on to control the adjacent part of the Sixteen Prefectures in Northern China as well. The Liao dynasty became the first state to control all of Manchuria.

In the early 12th century the Tungusic Jurchen people, who were Liao's tributaries, overthrew the Liao and formed the Jin dynasty (1115–1234), which went on to control parts of Northern China and Mongolia after a series of successful military campaigns. During the Mongol Yuan dynasty rule of China (1271–1368), Manchuria was administered as Liaoyang province. In 1375 Naghachu, a Mongol official of the Mongolia-based Northern Yuan dynasty of 1368–1635 in Liaoyang province invaded Liaodong, but later surrendered to the Ming dynasty in 1387. In order to protect the northern border areas, the Ming dynasty decided to "pacify" the Jurchens in order to deal with its problems with Yuan remnants along its northern border. The Ming solidified control over Manchuria under the Yongle Emperor, establishing the Nurgan Regional Military Commission of 1409–1435. Starting in the 1580s, a Jianzhou Jurchen chieftain, Nurhaci (1558–1626), started to unify Jurchen tribes of the region. Over the next several decades, the Jurchen took control of most of Manchuria. In 1616 Nurhaci founded the Later Jin dynasty, which later became known as the Qing dynasty. The Qing defeated the Evenk-Daur federation led by the Evenki chief Bombogor and beheaded Bombogor in 1640, with Qing armies massacring and deporting Evenkis and absorbing the survivors into the Banners.

Chinese cultural and religious influence such as Chinese New Year, the "Chinese god", motifs such as the dragon, spirals, and scrolls, agriculture, husbandry, methods of heating, and material goods such as iron cooking-pots, silk, and cotton spread among the Amur natives including the Udeghes, Ulchis, and Nanais.

In 1644, after peasant rebels sacked the Ming dynasty's capital of Beijing, the Jurchens (now called Manchus) allied with Ming general Wu Sangui and seized control of Beijing, overthrowing the short-lived Shun dynasty (1644–1649) and establishing Qing-dynasty rule (1644–1912) over all of China. The Manchu conquest of China involved the deaths of over 25 million people. The Qing dynasty built the Willow Palisade – a system of ditches and embankments – during the later 17th century to restrict the movement of Han civilians into Jilin and Heilongjiang. Only bannermen, including Chinese bannermen, were allowed to settle in Jilin and Heilongjiang.

After conquering the Ming, the Qing often identified their state as "China" (中國, Zhongguo; "Middle Kingdom"), and referred to it as Dulimbai Gurun ("Middle Kingdom") in Manchu. In the Qing shilu the lands of the Qing state (including Manchuria and present-day Xinjiang, Mongolia, and Tibet) are thus identified as "the Middle Kingdom" in both the Chinese and Manchu languages in roughly two-thirds of the cases, while the term refers to the traditional Chinese provinces populated by the Han in roughly one third of the cases. It was also common to use "China" (Zhongguo, Dulimbai gurun) to refer to the Qing in official documents, international treaties, and foreign affairs. In diplomatic documents, the term "Chinese language" (Dulimbai gurun i bithe) referred to the Chinese, Manchu, and Mongol languages, and the term "Chinese people" (中國人 Zhongguo ren; Manchu: Dulimbai gurun i niyalma) referred to all Han, Manchus, and Mongol subjects of the Qing. The Qing explicitly stated that the lands in Manchuria belonged to "China" (Zhongguo, Dulimbai gurun) in Qing edicts and in the 1689 Treaty of Nerchinsk.

Despite migration restrictions, Qing rule saw massively increasing numbers of Han Chinese both illegally and legally streaming into Manchuria and settling down to cultivate land – Manchu landlords desired Han Chinese peasants to rent their land and to grow grain; most Han Chinese migrants were not evicted as they crossed the Great Wall and Willow Palisade. During the eighteenth century Han Chinese farmed 500,000 hectares of privately owned land in Manchuria and 203,583 hectares of lands which were part of courier stations, noble estates, and Banner lands; in garrisons and towns in Manchuria Han Chinese made up 80% of the population.

The Qing resettled Han Chinese farmers from north China to the area along the Liao River in order to restore the land to cultivation. Han Chinese squatters reclaimed wasteland, and other Han rented land from Manchu landlords.

By the 18th century, despite officially prohibiting Han Chinese settlement on Manchu and Mongol lands, the Qing decided to settle Han refugees from northern China – who were suffering from famine, floods, and drought – into Manchuria and Inner Mongolia, so that Han Chinese farmed 500,000 hectares in Manchuria and tens of thousands of hectares in Inner Mongolia by the 1780s. The Qianlong Emperor allowed Han Chinese peasants suffering from drought to move into Manchuria despite his having issued edicts in favor of banning them from 1740 to 1776. Han Chinese then streamed into Manchuria, both illegally and legally, over the Great Wall of China and the Willow Palisade. Chinese tenant farmers rented or even claimed title to land from the "imperial estates" and Manchu Bannerlands in the area. Besides moving into the Liao area in southern Manchuria, Han Chinese settled the path linking Jinzhou, Fengtian, Tieling, Changchun, Hulun, and Ningguta during the Qianlong Emperor's reign, and Han Chinese had become the majority in urban areas of Manchuria by 1800. To increase the Imperial Treasury's revenue, the Qing sold formerly Manchu-only lands along the Sungari to Han Chinese at the beginning of the Daoguang Emperor's 1820–1850 reign, and Han Chinese filled up most of Manchuria's towns by the 1840s, according to Abbé Huc.

The Russian conquest of Siberia was met with indigenous resistance to colonization, but Russian Cossacks crushed the natives. The conquest of Siberia and Manchuria also resulted in the spread of infectious diseases. Historian John F. Richards wrote: "... New diseases weakened and demoralized the indigenous peoples of Siberia. The worst of these was smallpox "because of its swift spread, the high death rates, and the permanent disfigurement of survivors." ... In the 1690s, smallpox epidemics reduced Yukagir numbers by an estimated 44 percent." At the behest of people like Vasilii Poyarkov in 1645 and Yerofei Khabarov in 1650, Russian Cossacks killed some peoples like the Daur people of Inner Mongolia and Xinjiang to the extent that some authors speak of genocide.
The Daurs initially deserted their villages since they had heard about the cruelty of the Russians the first time Khabarov came. The second time he came, the Daurs decided to do battle against the Russians instead, but were slaughtered by Russian guns. The Russians came to be known as "red-beards". The Amur natives called Russian Cossacks luocha (羅剎), after demons in Buddhist mythology, because of their cruelty towards the Amur tribespeople, who were subjects of the Qing. The Qing viewed Russian proselytization of Eastern Orthodox Christianity to the indigenous peoples along the Amur River as a threat.

In 1858 Russian diplomacy forced a weakening Qing dynasty to cede Manchuria north of the Amur to Russia under the Treaty of Aigun. In 1860, with the Treaty of Peking, the Russians managed to obtain a further large slice of Manchuria, east of the Ussuri River. As a result, Manchuria became divided into a Russian half (known as "Outer Manchuria", and a remaining Chinese half (known as "Inner Manchuria"). In modern literature, "Manchuria" usually refers to Inner (Chinese) Manchuria. As a result of the Treaties of Aigun and Peking, Qing China lost access to the Sea of Japan.

History after 1860 

Inner Manchuria also came under strong Russian influence with the building of the Chinese Eastern Railway through Harbin to Vladivostok. In the Chuang Guandong movement, many Han farmers, mostly from the Shandong peninsula moved there. By 1921, Harbin, northern Manchuria's largest city, had a population of 300,000, including 100,000 Russians. Japan replaced Russian influence in the southern half of Inner Manchuria as a result of the Russo-Japanese War in 1904–1905. Most of the southern branch of the Chinese Eastern Railway was transferred from Russia to Japan, and became the South Manchurian Railway. Japanese influence extended into Outer Manchuria in the wake of the Russian Revolution of 1917, but Outer Manchuria had reverted to Soviet control by 1925. Manchuria was an important region due to its rich natural resources including coal, fertile soil, and various minerals. For pre–World War II Japan, Manchuria was an essential source of raw materials. Without occupying Manchuria, the Japanese probably could not have carried out their plan for conquest over Southeast Asia or taken the risk of attacking the United States and the British Empire in 1941.

There was a major epidemic known as the Manchurian plague in 1910–1911, likely caused by the inexperienced hunting of marmots, many of whom are diseased. The cheap railway transport and the harsh winters, where the hunters sheltered in close confinement, helped to propagate the disease. The response required close coordination between the Chinese, Russian and Japanese authorities and international disease experts held an 'International Plague Conference' in the northern city of Shenyang after the disease was under control to learn the lessons.

It was reported that among Banner people, both Manchu and Chinese (Hanjun) in Aihun, Heilongjiang in the 1920s, would seldom marry with Han civilians, but they (Manchu and Chinese Bannermen) would mostly intermarry with each other. Owen Lattimore reported that during his January 1930 visit to Manchuria, he studied a community in Jilin (Kirin), where both Manchu and Chinese Bannermen were settled at a town called Wulakai, and eventually the Chinese Bannermen there could not be differentiated from Manchus since they were effectively Manchufied (assimilated). The Han civilian population was in the process of absorbing and mixing with them when Lattimore wrote his article.

Around the time of World War I, Zhang Zuolin established himself as a powerful warlord with influence over most of Manchuria. During his rule, the Manchurian economy grew tremendously, backed by the immigration of Chinese from other parts of China. The Japanese assassinated him on 2 June 1928, in what is known as the Huanggutun Incident. Following the Mukden Incident in 1931 and the subsequent Japanese invasion of Manchuria, the Japanese declared Inner Manchuria an "independent state", and appointed the deposed Qing emperor Puyi as puppet emperor of Manchukuo. Under Japanese control, Manchuria was brutally run, with a systematic campaign of terror and intimidation against the local populations including arrests, organised riots and other forms of subjugation. Manchukuo was used by Japan as a base to invade the rest of China. At that time, hundreds of thousands of Japanese settlers arrived in Manchuria.

After the atomic bombing of Hiroshima, Japan in 1945, the Soviet Union invaded from Soviet Outer Manchuria as part of its declaration of war against Japan. Soon afterwards, the Chinese Communist Party and Chinese Nationalist Party (Kuomintang) started fighting for control over Manchuria. The communists won in the Liaoshen Campaign and took complete control over Manchuria. With the encouragement of the Soviet Union, Manchuria was then used as a staging ground during the Chinese Civil War for the Chinese Communist Party, which emerged victorious in 1949. Ambiguities in the treaties that ceded Outer Manchuria to Russia led to disputes over the political status of several islands. The Kuomintang government in Taiwan (Formosa) complained to the United Nations, which passed resolution 505 on February 1, 1952, denouncing Soviet actions over the violations of the 1945 Sino-Soviet Treaty of Friendship and Alliance.

As part of the Sino-Soviet split, this ambiguity led to armed conflict in 1969, called the Sino-Soviet border conflict, resulting in an agreement. In 2004, Russia agreed to transfer Yinlong Island and one half of Heixiazi Island to China, ending an enduring border dispute.

See also 
Indigenous peoples of Siberia
Religion in Northeast China
Tungusic peoples

References

Citations

Bibliography 

 

Elliott, Mark C. "The Limits of Tartary: Manchuria in Imperial and National Geographies." Journal of Asian Studies 59, no. 3 (2000): 603–46.

 Gamsa, Mark, "Manchuria: A Concise History", Bloomsbury Academic, 2020.

 Hata, Ikuhiro. "Continental Expansion: 1905–1941". In The Cambridge History of Japan. Vol. 6. Cambridge University Press. 1988.

Jones, Francis Clifford, Manchuria Since 1931, London, Royal Institute of International Affairs, 1949

 Kwong, Chi Man. War and Geopolitics in Interwar Manchuria (2017).

 Masafumi, Asada. "The China-Russia-Japan Military Balance in Manchuria, 1906–1918." Modern Asian Studies 44.6 (2010): 1283–1311.
 Nish, Ian. The History of Manchuria, 1840–1948: A Sino-Russo-Japanese Triangle (2016)

 

 Tamanoi, Mariko Asano. Crossed Histories: Manchuria in the Age of Empire (2005)

Tao, Jing-shen, The Jurchen in Twelfth-Century China. University of Washington Press, 1976, .
KISHI Toshihiko, MATSUSHIGE Mitsuhiro and MATSUMURA Fuminori eds, 20 Seiki Manshu Rekishi Jiten [Encyclopedia of 20th Century Manchuria History], Tokyo: Yoshikawa Kobunkan, 2012,

External links 

 
Inner Asia
Northeast Asia
Regions of China
Historical regions in Russia
Historical regions